Ovčiji Brod is a bridge spanning Zalomka river, which is located in Bratač village, Nevesinje, Bosnia and Herzegovina. It is another masterpiece of Ottoman bridge building in Bosnia and Herzegovina.

History
The bridge was probably erected in the sixteenth century or even later, but most likely after the Mehmed Paša Sokolović Bridge was built in Višegrad. It's suspected that this bridge was built by no other than the famous Ottoman architect Mimar Hayruddin, who also built the Stari Most in Mostar. The name of the bridge (Sheep Crossing) probably comes from shepherds who used to get their sheep herds across the river by using this bridge.

Construction
It is built entirely of stone, it is about three meters wide and its slender appearance, with three arches, irresistibly reminds of the diminished version of the Ćuprija na Drini in Višegrad. Despite its age, and very little restoration, the bridge is well preserved and still used today. The bridge, along with the Kalufi stećak necropolis, was nominated as potential candidates for UNESCO's listing of the World Cultural Heritage.

References

See also 
List of bridges in Bosnia and Herzegovina
List of National Monuments of Bosnia and Herzegovina

Ottoman bridges in Bosnia and Herzegovina
National Monuments of Bosnia and Herzegovina
Stone arch bridges in Bosnia and Herzegovina